Damien Murray (born 6 December 1970) is a former Australian rules footballer who played with North Melbourne in the Australian Football League (AFL).

Originally from South Australian National Football League club West Adelaide, Murray was drafted by North Melbourne with pick 80 in the 1989 National Draft.

Murray made his senior AFL debut against the Brisbane Bears in Round Two of the 1991 AFL season. His next match, against Essendon in round three, would prove to be his final match.

References

External links
 
 

1970 births
Australian rules footballers from South Australia
North Melbourne Football Club players
West Adelaide Football Club players
Living people